Nachiket Bhute (born 1 November 1999) is an Indian cricketer. He made his Twenty20 debut on 11 January 2021, for Vidarbha in the 2020–21 Syed Mushtaq Ali Trophy. He made his List A debut on 26 February 2021, for Vidarbha in the 2020–21 Vijay Hazare Trophy.

References

External links
 

1999 births
Living people
Indian cricketers
Vidarbha cricketers
Place of birth missing (living people)